Dürrenstein (1,878 m) is a mountain of the Ybbstal Alps in Lower Austria. It is located in the municipality of Lunz am See and is one of the highest peak in the area.

References

Mountains of the Alps
Mountains of Lower Austria